A circle of a sphere is a circle that lies on a sphere. Such a circle can be formed as the intersection of a sphere and a plane, or of two spheres. Circles of a sphere are the spherical geometry analogs of generalised circles in Euclidean space. A circle on a sphere whose plane passes through the center of the sphere is called a great circle, analogous to a Euclidean straight line; otherwise it is a small circle, analogous to a Euclidean circle. Circles of a sphere have radius less than or equal to the sphere radius, with equality when the circle is a great circle.

A circle of a sphere can also be characterized as the locus of points on the sphere at uniform distance from a given center point, or as a spherical curve of constant curvature.

On the earth
In the geographic coordinate system on a globe, the parallels of latitude are small circles, with the Equator the only great circle. By contrast, all meridians of longitude, paired with their opposite meridian in the other hemisphere, form great circles.

Related terminology
The diameter of the sphere which passes through the center of the circle is called its axis and the endpoints of this diameter are called its poles. A circle of a sphere can also be defined as the set of points at a given angular distance from a given pole.

Sphere-plane intersection
When the intersection of a sphere and a plane is not empty or a single point, it is a circle. This can be seen as follows:

Let S be a sphere with center O, P a plane which intersects S. Draw  perpendicular to P and meeting P at E. Let A and B be any two different points in the intersection. Then AOE and BOE are right triangles with a common side, OE, and hypotenuses AO and BO equal. Therefore, the remaining sides AE and BE are equal. This proves that all points in the intersection are the same distance from the point E in the plane P, in other words all points in the intersection lie on a circle C with center E. This proves that the intersection of P and S is contained in C. Note that OE is the axis of the circle.

Now consider a point D of the circle C. Since C lies in P, so does D. On the other hand, the triangles AOE and DOE are right triangles with a common side, OE, and legs EA and ED equal. Therefore, the hypotenuses AO and DO are equal, and equal to the radius of S, so that D lies in S. This proves that C is contained in the intersection of P and S.

As a corollary, on a sphere there is exactly one circle that can be drawn through three given points.

The proof can be extended to show that the points on a circle are all a common angular distance from one of its poles.

Compare also conic sections, which can produce ovals.

Sphere-sphere intersection
To show that a non-trivial intersection of two spheres is a circle, assume (without loss of generality) that one sphere (with radius ) is centered at the origin. Points on this sphere satisfy

Also without loss of generality, assume that the second sphere, with radius , is centered at a point on the positive x-axis, at distance  from the origin. Its points satisfy

The intersection of the spheres is the set of points satisfying both equations. Subtracting the equations gives

In the singular case , the spheres are concentric. There are two possibilities: if , the spheres coincide, and the intersection is the entire sphere; if , the spheres are disjoint and the intersection is empty.
When a is nonzero, the intersection lies in a vertical plane with this x-coordinate, which may intersect both of the spheres, be tangent to both spheres, or external to both spheres.
The result follows from the previous proof for sphere-plane intersections.

See also
Line-plane intersection
Line–sphere intersection

References

Further reading

Rotational symmetry
Spherical curves
Circles